The Brook Hill School is an independent, Christian day and boarding school for students in grades PreK-12 located in Bullard just south of Tyler, Texas. The school was founded in 1997 by Steve Dement with thirty-one students in middle school. The boarding school began soon after in 2003.

Brook Hill also houses the American Freedom Museum, which houses artifacts from all periods of American history.  The museum is open to the general public on Wednesdays and Saturdays, and to tour groups of 15 or more on all other days except Sunday when it is closed entirely.

Accreditation

SACS: Southern Association of Colleges & Schools

School Awards
2020, 2021, 2022 Best K-12 School in Smith County according to Niche.com  2012-2013 Henderson Cup Champions, making Brook Hill the overall best school in the state of Texas, TAPPS division 3A for Academics, Athletics, and Fine Arts.

State championships
Boys Baseball - 2004, 2011, 2012, 2013
Boys Golf - 2010, 2011, 2013 and 2014
Boys Football - 2011 
Girls Soccer - 2013, 2014

Notable alumni
A.J. Minter - Pitcher for the Atlanta Braves (#33). Pitched during World Series against the Houston Astros.
Mason Lieberman - Forbes 30 Under 30 for Gaming, 2022

References

Schools in Smith County, Texas
Private K-12 schools in Texas
Preparatory schools in Texas
Christian schools in Texas
Private boarding schools in Texas
Co-educational boarding schools
High schools in Texas
Private schools in Texas
Private high schools in Texas
Educational institutions established in 1997
1997 establishments in Texas